

This is a list of scheduled monuments in the English county of Lancashire.

In the United Kingdom, a scheduled monument is a "nationally important" archaeological site or historic building that has been given protection against unauthorised change by being placed on a list (or "schedule") by the Secretary of State for Digital, Culture, Media and Sport; Historic England takes the leading role in identifying such sites. Scheduled monuments are defined in the Ancient Monuments and Archaeological Areas Act 1979 and the National Heritage Act 1983. There are about 20,000 scheduled monument entries on the list, which is maintained by Historic England; more than one site can be included in a single entry.

While a scheduled monument can also be recognised as a listed building, Historic England considers listed building status as a better way of protecting buildings than scheduled monument status. If a monument is considered by Historic England to "no longer merit scheduling" it can be descheduled.

Lancashire has over 140 scheduled monuments including burial mounds, Roman remains, medieval sites, mining relics, castles and various bridges.

See also

 Grade I listed buildings in Lancashire
 Grade II* listed buildings in Lancashire
 Scheduled monuments in Greater Manchester

References

Notes

Citations

Buildings and structures in Lancashire
History of Lancashire
Lancashire-related lists
Lancashire scheduled monuments
Scheduled monuments in Lancashire